Potha may refer to:

 Potha, Khyber Pakhtunkhwa - a village in Khyber Pakhtunkhwa province of Pakistan
 Potha, Punjab - a village in the Punjab province of Pakistan